Ko Jong-soo ( born October 30, 1978) is a South Korean football coach and former football player.

Growth Background
Born in Yeosu, Jeollanam-do, he graduated from Yeosu West Elementary School, Yeosu Gubong Middle School, and Kumho High School.

Career
He rose to stardom during the 1998 World Cup, along with Lee Dong-Gook, and Ahn Jung-Hwan. He was once called "the greatest technician in Korea," for his pace, skillful free kicks, and his left foot. He can operate in central midfield as well on the left wing.

In the early 2000s in the K-League, there was a nickname for where he'd kick the ball called "Go Jong-soo Zone ", and his skills were so good that if he kicked a free kick there, there was a high probability that it'd lead to a goal.
He also scored a free kick goal against then-world goalkeeper Chilavert in 2001.

He was traded to Chunnam for the services of Kim Nam-Il who went to Suwon in exchange, but did not renew the contract. He is not a free agent under the regulations. He had no choice but to play for any other team but Chunnam.

In September 2006, he has stated that he has managed to shed over 20 lbs weighing 78 kg whereas he weighed about 76 kg during his heyday.  In spite of renewed hopes of his much anticipated return, the latest Ko sighting was in December 2006.  Ko was reportedly not in football shape and evaded reporter questions by driving off in a white Mercedes Benz. (But Ko denied this claim, saying: "After hearing that news, once I thought to give up the life of footballer.") On 8 January 2007, Daejeon Citizen signed Ko one year after Chunnam Dragons agreed on his transfer. His wage will be decided based on how well he performs in winter training camp in Cyprus. Ko expressed a strong desire to return to the sport, telling an interviewer: "I will play for Daejeon regarding this chance as the last."

In February 2009, he announced his retirement.

Play Style
He is considered a player who is good at using his left foot, is skilled at taking free kicks, and can bring creativity to mid-field lines. He became known as "L'enfant Terrible" after wowing audiences with sensuous passes, shots, and sharp crosses.

Things Else
He played for the Korea-Japan All-Star game in January 2001, and scored a fantastic free-kick against Jose Luis Chilavert.

On September 4, 2002, he scored the longest-left goal (57m) in an away game against Jeonbuk Hyundai Motors in the K-League.

In 2007, he was named the ' most anticipated soccer player of 2007 ' by a leading online newspaper and a website specializing in overseas soccer.

Club statistics

National team statistics

International goals
Results list South Korea's goal tally first.

Honours

Club

Suwon Bluewings
K League 1 (3) : 1998, 1999, 2004
Korean FA Cup (1) : 2002
K-League Cup (4) : 1999 (Daehan Fire Insurance Cup), 1999 (Adidas Cup), 2000, 2001
Korean Super Cup (2):  1999, 2000
AFC Champions League (2) : 2000–01, 2001–02
Asian Super Cup (2) : 2001, 2002

Individual 
 1993 Winner of the Daejeon Soccer Contest
 1994 Baek-Rok-Ki Soccer contest Player of the Year
 1997 Adidas Cup Most Assist Soccer Player
 1998 Won the Best Sports Player of Sports Seoul
 1998 K-League MVP Award
 1998 K-League Best 11 selected
 1999 K-League Best 11 selected
 2000 Adidas Cup Winner Score King
 2000 Hummel-Stu popular award
 AFC 's Goal in February 2001
 The 2001 AFC Player of the Month '
 Winner of the 2007 Windsor Awards

References

External links 
  
 
 

1978 births
Living people
People from Yeosu
Suwon Samsung Bluewings players
Kyoto Sanga FC players
Jeonnam Dragons players
Daejeon Hana Citizen FC players
K League 1 players
J1 League players
K League 1 Most Valuable Player Award winners
1998 FIFA World Cup players
2001 FIFA Confederations Cup players
Footballers at the 2000 Summer Olympics
Olympic footballers of South Korea
Association football midfielders
Expatriate footballers in Japan
South Korean expatriate sportspeople in Japan
South Korean expatriate footballers
South Korea international footballers
South Korean footballers
Sportspeople from South Jeolla Province
Daejeon Hana Citizen FC managers
K League 2 managers
South Korean football managers